Altrincham Hospital is a modern community hospital on Railway Street in Altrincham, Greater Manchester, England. It is managed by the Manchester University NHS Foundation Trust.

History
The hospital was built to replace the aging Altrincham General Hospital in Market Street. The new hospital, which was built by Pochins, a Cheshire-based construction company, opened in April 2015. The new facilities installed at the commissioning of the new hospital included digital radiography equipment costing £350,000.

References

External links
Official site

Hospitals established in 2015
2015 establishments in England
Hospitals in Greater Manchester
NHS hospitals in England
Altrincham